Ruatara may refer to:
 Ruatara (chief) (c. 1787–1815), a chief of the Ngāpuhi iwi in New Zealand
 Ruatara (gastropod), a member of the family Charopidae

pt:Ruatara